Stephen Dillet Sr. (1796 - 1880) was a businessman, civil rights leader, public official, and parliamentarian in the Bahamas. He was elected to the House of Assembly in the 1833 Bahamian general election, the colony's first to allow non-white voters.

Biography 
He was born in Saint-Domingue. Etienne Dillet and Hester Argo (Mary Cartherine Esther Argo / Hester Argeaux) were his parents. He was brought at age 6 with his mother to the Bahamas from Haiti. He was the maternal grandfather of James Weldon Johnson.

His sons Thomas William Dillet and Stephen Albert Dillet Jr.  also became  public officials. Stephen Dillet Primary School in Nassau, Bahamas is named for him.

References

1880 deaths
1796 births
People of Saint-Domingue
19th-century politicians
Members of the House of Assembly of the Bahamas